Zodiac Milpro, headquartered in Paris, France, is a company that manufactures inflatable boats and rigid hull inflatable boats for the emergency services, military and professional users, including heavy-duty inflatable work boats that can carry payloads up to four tons and passengers for ecotourism, whale watching, etc.

Ownership
Headquartered in Paris, France and with manufacturing facilities in Delta, British Columbia, Roses, Spain, and Stevensville, Maryland. Zodiac Milpro was a business unit of Zodiac Aerospace till 2008, when it was renamed Milpro. In 2011 it was spun off from Zodiac Aerospace and it became an independent company.

In December 2012, Zodiac Milpro Group was sold by its parent company, Zodiac Marine and Pool, being acquired by Oaktree Capital.

The following year, Zodiac Milpro acquired the British inflatable boat manufacturer Avon Inflatables, which was renamed Zodiac Milpro UK.

Name 
Though Zodiac Milpro and Zodiac Nautic produce a large range of both inflatable and rigid-hulled boats, the name "Zodiac" has become synonymous with inflatable boats such as the FC470 and as a generic term for inflatable boats.

History 

The first inflatable boats were designed in 1920 by Zodiac, which produced its first prototypes for the army in 1934. In 1934, Zodiac engineer Pierre Debroutelle designed the prototype of an inflatable kayak. In 1937, interested in his research, the Naval Aviation commissioned him to develop a boat capable of carrying torpedoes and bombs. Pierre Debroutelle developed a new prototype: a U-shaped boat equipped with two side air chambers joined by a wooden dashboard: the ancestor of the modern Zodiac inflatable boat.

In 1940, Zodiac invented the prototype of the first inflatable boat. 

In the early 1960s, the Royal National Lifeboat Institute in Great Britain designed the first rigid hulled inflatable boat (RIB). This hybrid craft was developed for high speed, offshore sea and rescue operations. Zodiac Milpro continued research and development of this new technology and developed the concept into today's rigid hull inflatable boats.

In 1987, Zodiac SA acquired a majority share in the capital of Zodiac Marine Ltd. and a majority stake in Hurricane Rescue Craft Inc. and formed Zodiac Hurricane Marine Inc. (ZHM).

In 1991, Zodiac SA combined its Toronto-based distribution subsidiary (ZIT) with its manufacturing company in Richmond (ZHM), to form Zodiac Hurricane Technologies Inc. (ZHT). Today, Zodiac Hurricane Technologies is the world's largest manufacturer of professional RIBs.

Ranges 

 Zodiac Milpro Sea RIB range (from 4m to 11m)
 Zodiac Hurricane RIB range (from 6m to 13m)
 Zodiac Milpro Futura Commando range, multi-mission military inflatable boats
 Zodiac Milpro ZMSR and ERB inflatable rescue boats
 Zodiac Milpro Heavy Duty and Grand Raid professional multi-purpose inflatable boats

Users

 Royal Canadian Navy,

References

External links 
 Official website

Companies based in Paris
Inflatable boat manufacturers